The Burundian passport is issued to citizens of Burundi for international travel.

Physical appearance 
The biometric passport is a 30-page document on blue paper. The first page of the passport (the page after the cover page) bears, in capital letters and in three languages, Kirundi, French and English, the name of the country (REPUBLIKA Y'UBURUNDI; REPUBLIQUE DU BURUNDI; REPUBLIC OF BURUNDI) and the word "passport" (IGITABU C'INZIRA, PASSEPORT, PASSPORT).  The coat of arms of Burundi appears between the name of the country and the word "passport". Burundi's coat of arms and an outline of the country's geographic shape also appear on the first page.

Identification page 
 Passport holder photo (Width: 30mm, Height: 40mm, Head height (up to the top of the hair): 75%; Distance from the top of the photo to the top of the hair: 6.25%)
 Type ("P" for passport)
 Code of the country
 Serial number of the passport
 Surname and first name of the passport holder
 Citizenship
 Date of birth (DD.MM.YYYY)
 Gender (M for men or F for women)
 Place of Birth
 Date of issue (DD.MM.YYYY)
 Passport holder's signature
 Expiry date (DD.MM.YYYY)

Visa requirements 

, Burundian citizens had visa-free or visa on arrival access to 44 countries and territories, ranking the Burundian passport 91st in terms of travel freedom (tied with Nigerian passport) according to the Henley visa restrictions index.

See also
List of passports

References

Burundi
Politics of Burundi